Bonnie Wittmeier (born 15 September 1966) is a Canadian gymnast. She competed in six events at the 1984 Summer Olympics.

In 1992, Wittmeier was inducted into the Manitoba Sports Hall of Fame.

References

External links
 

1966 births
Living people
Canadian female artistic gymnasts
Olympic gymnasts of Canada
Gymnasts at the 1984 Summer Olympics
Sportspeople from Winnipeg
Manitoba Sports Hall of Fame inductees